Golyshev is a Russian masculine surname, its feminine counterpart is Golysheva. It may refer to:
Anatoly Golyshev (born 1995), Russian ice hockey forward
Dmitri Golyshev (born 1985), Russian football player
Pavel Golyshev (born 1987), Russian football player, brother of Dimitri
Viktor Golyshev (born 1937), English-to-Russian translator
Yefim Golyshev (1897–1970), Ukrainian-born painter

Russian-language surnames